Merlin - Bard Of The Unseen is the 11th studio album by the Dutch progressive rock band Kayak. This concept-album is a new version of side 1 of their 1981 album Merlin, with nine new songs added.

At concerts in 2003, the band played this rock-opera in its entirety. Singer Cindy Oudshoorn was credited as special guest on the album, but became a permanent member of the band after the tour.

Track listing

 "Merlin" - 7:50
 "Tintagel" - 2:49
 "The Future King" - 2:58
 "The Sword In The Stone" - 3:43
 "When The Seer Looks Away" - 4:18
 "Branded" - 3:51
 "At Arthur's Court" - 3:15
 "The Otherworld" - 7:59
 "The Purest Of Knights" - 5:48
 "Friendship And Love" - 5:13
 "The King's Enchanter" - 2:31
 "Niniane (Lady Of The Lake)" - 7:08
 "The Last Battle" - 8:11
 "Avalon" - 3:44

Words by Irene Linders and Ton Scherpenzeel. Music by Ton Scherpenzeel, except tracks 3, 5, 8, 13: Pim Koopman

Lineup
 Ton Scherpenzeel - keyboards, vocals, percussion
 Pim Koopman - drums, backing vocals, voice-over
 Bert Heerink - lead and backing vocals
 Bert Veldkamp - bass guitar
 Joost Vergoossen - guitars
 Rob Vunderink - guitars, lead and backing vocals

Guest musicians
 Cindy Oudshoorn - lead and backing vocals
 The New Philharmonic Orchestra

References

External links
Official homepage

Kayak (band) albums
2003 albums
Works based on Arthurian legend